The Miami Dolphins are a professional American football team based in the Miami metropolitan area. The Dolphins compete in the National Football League (NFL) as a member club of the league's American Football Conference (AFC) East division. The team plays its home games at Hard Rock Stadium, located in the northern suburb of Miami Gardens, Florida. The team is currently owned by Stephen M. Ross. The Dolphins are the oldest professional sports team in Florida. Of the four AFC East teams, the Dolphins are the only team in the division that was not a charter member of the American Football League (AFL). The Dolphins were also one of the first professional football teams in the southeast, along with the Atlanta Falcons.

The Dolphins were founded by attorney-politician Joe Robbie and actor-comedian Danny Thomas. They began play in the AFL in 1966. The region had not had a professional football team since the days of the Miami Seahawks, who played in the All-America Football Conference in 1946, before becoming the first incarnation of the Baltimore Colts. For the first few years, the Dolphins' full-time training camp and practice facilities were at Saint Andrew's School, a private, boys boarding prep school in Boca Raton. Miami joined the NFL as a result of the 1970 AFL–NFL merger.

The team played in its first Super Bowl in Super Bowl VI, losing to the Dallas Cowboys, 24–3. The following year, the Dolphins completed the NFL's only perfect season, culminating in a Super Bowl win, winning all 14 of their regular-season games, and all three of their playoff games, including Super Bowl VII. They were the third NFL team to accomplish a perfect regular season, and remain the only team to do so since the AFL-NFL merger, the time known as the Super Bowl era. The next year, the Dolphins won Super Bowl VIII, becoming the first team to appear in three consecutive Super Bowls, and the second team (the first AFL/AFC team) to win back-to-back championships. Miami also appeared in Super Bowl XVII and Super Bowl XIX, losing both games.

For most of their early history, the Dolphins were coached by Don Shula, the most successful head coach in professional football history in terms of total games won. Under Shula, the Dolphins posted losing records in only two of his 26 seasons as the head coach. During the period spanning 1983 to the end of 1999, quarterback Dan Marino became one of the most prolific passers in NFL history, breaking numerous league passing records. Marino led the Dolphins to five division titles, 10 playoff appearances, and an appearance in Super Bowl XIX before retiring following the 1999 season.

Since Marino's retirement, they have experienced mediocre levels of success and have just five playoff appearances (2000, 2001, 2008, 2016, and 2022) and two division titles (2000 and 2008).

Franchise history

The Miami Dolphins joined the American Football League (AFL) when an expansion franchise was awarded to lawyer Joseph Robbie and actor Danny Thomas in 1965 for $7.5 million, although Thomas would eventually sell his stake in the team to Robbie. During the summer of 1966, the Dolphins' training camp was in St. Pete Beach with practices in August at Boca Ciega High School in Gulfport.

The Dolphins were the worst team with a 15–39–2 record in their first four seasons under head coach George Wilson, before Don Shula was hired as head coach. Shula was a Paul Brown disciple who had been lured from the Baltimore Colts, after losing Super Bowl III two seasons earlier to the AFL's New York Jets, and finishing 8–5–1 the following season. Shula got his first NFL coaching job from then-Detroit head coach George Wilson, who hired him as the defensive coordinator. The AFL merged with the NFL in 1970, and the Dolphins were assigned to the AFC East division in the NFL's new American Football Conference.

For the rest of the 20th century, the Shula-led Dolphins emerged as one of the most dominant teams in the NFL, with only two losing seasons between 1970 and 1999. They were extremely successful in the 1970s, completing the first complete perfect season in NFL history by finishing with a 14–0 regular-season record in 1972 and winning the Super Bowl that year. It was the first of two consecutive Super Bowl wins and one of three appearances in a row. The 1980s and 1990s were also moderately successful. The early 80s teams made two Super Bowls despite losing both times and saw the emergence of future Hall of Fame quarterback Dan Marino, who went on to break numerous NFL passing records, holding many of them until the late 2000s. After winning every game against the division rival Buffalo Bills in the 1970s, the two teams gradually developed a competitive rivalry in the 80s and 90s, often competing for AFC supremacy when Jim Kelly emerged as the quarterback for the Bills. The Dolphins have also maintained a strong rivalry with the New York Jets throughout much of their history.

Following the retirements of Marino and Shula and the rise of Tom Brady and the New England Patriots, the Dolphins suffered a decline in the 2000s and 2010s. During this period, the team's level of play was largely described as mediocre. They have only made the playoffs four times since Marino's retirement and have largely been unable to find a consistent quarterback to replace him. The team suffered a franchise-worst 1–15 season in 2007. They rebounded the following season, becoming the first team in NFL history to win their division and make a playoff appearance following a league-worst season. That same season, the Dolphins upset the New England Patriots on the road during Week 3 thanks to the use of the gimmick Wildcat offense, which handed the Patriots their first regular-season loss since December 10, 2006, in which coincidentally, they were also beaten by the Dolphins. However, this success in 2008 proved to be an outlier during this period in the franchise's history; to date, it is the last season the Dolphins won the AFC East. However, the Dolphins have been competitive against the Patriots despite their decline, with notable wins coming in 2004, 2008, 2014, 2018, and 2019. Until 2020, they were also the last team in the AFC East to win the division championship aside from the Patriots, doing so in 2008.

Championships

Super Bowl championships

AFC championships

Rivalries

Buffalo Bills 

The Dolphins and the Buffalo Bills have a long-standing rivalry, as there are stark characteristic differences between the cities of Miami and Buffalo, especially in climate and culture. The rivalry was extremely lopsided in favor of Miami during the 1970s, as the Dolphins won all 20 games against the Bills during that decade. Fortunes changed in the 1980s and 1990s when Jim Kelly became the Bills' starting quarterback. Though both teams were extremely dominant during that period, the Bills ultimately held the edge and dominated the Dolphins during their four playoff match-ups in the 1990s, with the Dolphins' only playoff win coming after Kelly's retirement. With the rise of Tom Brady and the Patriots during the 2000s and the retirements of Kelly and Dolphins quarterback Dan Marino, the Bills-Dolphins rivalry has faded in relevance, but remains somewhat intense to this day. Some former Dolphins have gone to play for the Bills as well, most notably Dan Carpenter, Chris Hogan, and Charles Clay.

In the 2020s, the rivalry sharpened, with QBs Tua Tagovailoa and Josh Allen drafted by their respected teams. With Josh Allen’s all time record against Miami is 8-2, the Dolphins hadn’t beaten the Bills since 2016. Tua Tagovailoa defeated the Bills in 2022 by a score of 21-19. Since then, the rivalry games have been decided by 3 points or less.

New England Patriots 

The Dolphins dominated the New England Patriots during the 1970s and the 1990s, but there were some notable moments as well, including a 1982 game now known as the Snowplow Game. Fortunes changed when Tom Brady became the franchise quarterback for the Patriots, and since then, the Patriots have virtually dominated the AFC, especially the AFC East. Miami did pose more of a challenge to the Brady-led Patriots in the 2000s, however, winning more games against them than the Bills or Jets did during that decade. Notable wins over New England by the Dolphins include the Miracle in Miami, which involved a dramatic last-minute game-winning touchdown that paralleled "The Night that Courage Wore Orange", where in 2004, the Dolphins, at 2–11, upset the defending Super Bowl champion Patriots 28–29, and handed them the second of their 2 losses that season. The rivalry briefly intensified in 2005 when Nick Saban, Bill Belichick's former Browns defensive coordinator was hired as their new head coach and when Saban nearly signed quarterback Drew Brees, as well as in 2008, when the two teams battled for the AFC East division title. Miami and New England are also the only two franchises to have posted undefeated regular-season records since the NFL-AFL merger, with Miami going 14–0 in 1972 and New England going 16–0 in 2007, but only the 1972 Dolphins were able to win the Super Bowl.

New York Jets 

The New York Jets are perhaps Miami's most bitter rivals. Dolphins fans despise the Jets due to the sheer amount of New York City transplants who have moved to South Florida and the Jets' usual cocky demeanor. Just as the Bills-Dolphins rivalry is motivated by differences, the Dolphins-Jets series is also notable for the differences between New York and Miami. Unlike the former, this rivalry has been more consistent over the years. Some of the more memorable moments in this rivalry include Dan Marino's fake spike, Vinny Testaverde leading the Jets to a notable comeback on Monday Night Football, and former Jets quarterback Chad Pennington signing with the Dolphins and leading them to a divisional title. The two teams have also played in the 1982 AFC Championship, with Miami winning to face the Washington Redskins in Super Bowl XVII.

Tampa Bay Buccaneers 

Since the founding of the Tampa Bay Buccaneers in 1976, the Dolphins and Buccaneers have shared a mellow in-state rivalry and were the only two teams in Florida until the Jacksonville Jaguars joined the NFL in 1995.

Indianapolis Colts 
When the then-Baltimore Colts were inserted into the AFC East following the AFL/NFL merger, they sparked a heated rivalry with the Dolphins, as a controversy involving the hiring of former Colts coach Don Shula forced Miami to forfeit a first-round draft pick. The Dolphins and Colts faced off several times in the AFC playoffs during the 1970s, including the AFC championship game leading up to Super Bowl VI, which the Dolphins lost to the Dallas Cowboys. The rivalry cooled down in the 1980s after the Colts struggled and moved to Indianapolis, but heated up once again in the late 90s until the Colts were reassigned into the AFC South as a result of the 2002 realignment of the NFL's divisions.

Other AFC rivals 

The Dolphins also share historic rivalries with other AFC teams such as the Las Vegas Raiders, Los Angeles Chargers, and Pittsburgh Steelers, stemming from often competing against these teams in the playoffs during the Don Shula era, and to a lesser extent, the Jacksonville Jaguars, who also represent the state of Florida.

Facilities

Stadiums

The Dolphins originally played all home games in the Orange Bowl in Miami. They moved to the new Joe Robbie Stadium after the 1986 season. From 1993 to 2011, the Dolphins shared the stadium with Major League Baseball's Florida Marlins (now known as the Miami Marlins). The venue has had multiple naming rights deals since 1996, carrying the names Pro Player Stadium, Dolphins Stadium, Dolphin Stadium, LandShark Stadium, Sun Life Stadium, New Miami Stadium and, as of August 2016, Hard Rock Stadium. The Miami Dolphins share Hard Rock Stadium with the NCAA Miami Hurricanes. The 2015–2016 season was the first season in the newly renovated Hard Rock Stadium. The Dolphins spent more than two years and over $400 million on a major overhaul to Hard Rock Stadium. Every seat was replaced and the lower-level seats were moved closer to the field. There are roughly 10,000 fewer seats.

Training

St. Petersburg Beach hosted the Dolphins' first training camp in 1966. St. Andrew's School in Boca Raton hosted training camp in the late 1960s. The Dolphins subsequently trained in Miami Gardens at Biscayne College, later renamed St. Thomas University, from 1970 until 1993.

In 1993, the Dolphins opened the Miami Dolphins Training Facility at Nova Southeastern University in Davie. In 2006, the facility added a domed field that allows the team to practice during thunderstorms which are common in the area during the summer.

In 2021, the Dolphins opened a new, 135 million training facility, dubbed the Baptist Health Training Complex, the Dolphins will practice in. The complex is located next to Hard Rock Stadium in Miami Gardens.

Franchise information

Logos and uniforms

Leaping dolphin (1966–2012)

The Dolphins logo and uniforms remained fairly consistent from the team's founding through 2012. The team's colors were originally aqua and coral, with the coral color paying tribute to the Miami Seahawks and to the many natural coral reefs in Biscayne Bay. The team's original logo consisted of a sunburst with a leaping dolphin wearing a football helmet bearing the letter M. At their debut in 1966, a lighter & brighter orange was used instead of the deep coral color. The dolphin's head was near the center of the sunburst. In the 1967 season, the dolphin was centered on the sunburst, but it reverted to the original placement between 1968 and 1973. By 1974, the dolphin's body was centered on the sunburst in a slightly smaller logo than the 1967 version. The uniforms featured white pants with aqua and orange stripes, paired with either a white or aqua jersey. On the white jersey, aqua block numbers and names were outlined in orange, with aqua and orange sleeve stripes. Starting with the 1972 perfect season, these uniforms were used as the primary uniforms for road games and daytime home games, due to the extreme heat of South Florida. The team also had an aqua jersey used mainly for night home games or road games in which the opponent chose to wear white. The aqua jersey featured white block numbers and names with an orange outline, and orange and white sleeve stripes.

An update was given to the logo in 1997 – the sunburst was simplified and the dolphin was darkened and given a more serious game-face expression. The uniforms remained the same; however, a different block number font was used and navy drop shadows were added.

On very rare occasions, an orange jersey was used for primetime games. The uniforms essentially swapped the location of orange and aqua from the aqua jersey. The orange jersey was first used on a Sunday night in 2003 against Washington, a Dolphin win. In 2004, the orange jersey was brought back for an Monday Night Football match pitting the 2–11 Dolphins against the 12–1 defending champion New England Patriots. The Dolphins scored a huge upset win after trailing by 11 points with less than 5 minutes remaining. Due to the unusual orange jerseys, the game has become known within some Dolphin circles as "The Night That Courage Wore Orange". The orange jerseys were used for a 2009 Monday night win against the New York Jets. However, the Dolphins would lose a 2010 Sunday night matchup with the Jets, their first loss in orange, and the orange jerseys in the original style would not be worn again.

In 2009, the Dolphins switched to black shoes for the first time since the early 1970s glory days, following a recent trend among NFL teams. However, by 2011, they returned to wearing white shoes.

The Dolphins' final game in the original style uniforms with block numbers and the iconic leaping dolphin logo was the final game of the 2012 season, a 28–0 shutout loss to the New England Patriots in Foxboro. The white jerseys were worn for the game, and as rumors of a new look had been swirling, many fans watching knew that it would likely be the last time their team would wear the leaping dolphin logo.

Stylized swimming dolphin (2013–present)
A radically new logo and new uniforms were unveiled shortly before the 2013 NFL Draft. The new logo features a stylized aqua dolphin swimming in front of a heavily modified version of the orange sunburst. The dolphin in the logo is more vague and artistic, and is not wearing a helmet as it is merely a silhouette of a dolphin cast in aqua and navy.

Navy was incorporated as featured color for the first time, with orange becoming greatly de-emphasized. The uniforms feature both white pants and aqua pants, with a white or aqua jersey. The Dolphins continue to wear white at home, just as they had with the previous uniforms, with aqua being used for primetime home games. The white jersey features aqua numbers and names in a unique custom font, with orange and navy outlines on the numbers; however, the names only use navy as an outline color. The aqua jerseys use white numbers with an orange and aqua outline, and white names with a navy outline. The helmets are white with a white facemask, just like the final years of the previous look; however, navy is a prominent color on the helmet stripe, joining aqua and a de-emphasized orange. Both jerseys have large "Dolphins" text above the numbers, written in the team's new script. The pants are either aqua or white, and contain no markings other than a small team wordmark.

In 2018, the team made some slight modifications to the logo and uniform set: The shades of orange and aqua were tweaked, and navy blue was removed from the color scheme, only remaining on the logo.

Throwback uniforms
In 2015, the Dolphins brought back their 1970s aqua uniforms for a few select games. Four years later, they brought back a white version from the same era as a second alternate uniform. The aqua throwbacks were worn during the now-famous 2018 Miracle in Miami play against the Patriots.

Color Rush uniform
On September 29, 2016, the Dolphins debuted their new Color Rush uniform in a Thursday Night Football game against the Cincinnati Bengals. The all-orange uniform marked the first time since 2010 that the Dolphins wore an orange uniform. However, the set was only used for that game as the Dolphins immediately retired the uniform soon after.

In later years, the Dolphins wore similar all-aqua or all-white uniforms in select games as the NFL gradually relaxed its rules regarding hosiery.

Fight song
The song was written and composed by Lee Ofman, and has similar instrumentation and lyrics to the fight song of the Houston Oilers. Ofman approached the Dolphins with it before the 1972 season because he wanted music to inspire his favorite team. The fight song would soon serve as a good luck charm for the Dolphins that season. The Dolphins became the first team in NFL history to record an undefeated season, going 17–0 en route to victory over the Washington Redskins in Super Bowl VII. The following season, Miami posted an equally impressive 15–2 record and capped the season with another title, defeating the Minnesota Vikings in Super Bowl VIII. The back-to-back championship runs, coupled with the popularity of the fight song amongst Dolphins fans, have ensured the song's longevity. The Dolphins revealed a new fight song by T-Pain and Jimmy Buffett featuring Pitbull on August 7, 2009, which was introduced for the 2009 NFL season. The fight song was played during the preseason home opener against the Jacksonville Jaguars on August 17, 2009, but was not played during the second preseason game against the Carolina Panthers on August 22, 2009, after being booed heavily in the first game. Furthermore, the team has preferred to play Buffett's song "Fins" after scores during the 2009 regular season instead of the traditional fight song.

Cheerleaders

The team's cheerleaders are known collectively as the Miami Dolphins Cheerleaders. The company had its debut in 1978 as the Dolphins Starbrites. (The name referred to the co-sponsor, Starbrite Car Polish.) The cheerleaders' founding choreographer was June Taylor, famed colleague of Jackie Gleason, who led the squad until her retirement in 1990.

Special Teams/Volunteer Program
In April 2010, the Dolphins started the first Volunteer Program in the NFL. Special Teams is a unique volunteer organization created to enlist and mobilize the ongoing services of the community with the Dolphins staff, players and alumni. The mission of the Special Teams is to offer hands-on services to communities and families in need, to partner with existing organizations on worthwhile social, civic and charitable programs, to provide assistance at Miami Dolphins Foundation events, and to support community efforts in times of emergency. This program is headed by Leslie Nixon and Sergio Xiques. Since its inception, Special Teams has given over 250,000 community services hours to the South Florida and Mexico community.

Mascots

T.D.

("The Dolphin")
On Friday, April 18, 1997, the first "official" mascot of the Miami Dolphins was introduced. The 7-foot mascot made his public debut on April 19 at Pro Player Stadium during the team's draft-day party. The team then made a "Name the Mascot" contest that drew over 13,000 entries covering all 50 states and 22 countries. 529 names were suggested. The winning entry was announced at the annual Dolphins Awards Banquet on June 4, 1997.

Dolfan Denny
Denny Sym cheered on the Miami Dolphins for 33 years as a one-man sideline show, leading Miami crowds in cheers and chants in his glittering coral (orange) and aqua hat from the Dolphins’ first game in 1966 until 2000. Sym died on March 18, 2007. He was 72.

Flipper

From 1966 to 1968, and in the 1970s a live dolphin was situated in a water tank in the open (east) end of the Orange Bowl. He would jump in the tank to celebrate touchdowns and field goals. The tank that was set up in the 1970s was manufactured by Evan Bush and maintained during the games by Evan Bush and Dene Whitaker. Flipper was removed from the Orange Bowl after 1968 to save costs, and in the 1970s due to stress.

Radio and television

In August 2010, the team launched its own regional TV "network". The Dolphins Television Network comprises 10 South Florida TV stations that agreed to carry the team-produced coverage. Preseason games are broadcast on television through WFOR-TV in Miami-Dade and Broward counties, WTVX in West Palm Beach, WBBH-TV in Fort Myers, and WRDQ in Orlando. Longtime TV and radio personality Dick Stockton provides play-by-play commentary, with Dolphins Hall-of-Fame QB Bob Griese and former Dolphins WR Nat Moore providing color commentary. The radio broadcast team features Jimmy Cefalo providing play-by-play commentary and Joe Rose providing color commentary during preseason games, along with Griese for regular-season games. Griese replaced longtime color commentator Jim Mandich, who played for the Dolphins under Don Shula. Mandich lost his fight with cancer in 2011, opening the door for Griese as his replacement. Radio coverage as of the 2023 season will be provided by WINZ (940 AM) and WBGG-FM (105.9 FM). Additionally, games can also be heard in Spanish on WNMA (1210 AM), with Raúl Striker Jr. and Joaquin Duro providing play-by-play and color commentary, respectively.

CBS-owned WFOR, in addition to preseason telecasts, airs most of the Dolphins' regular season games. If the team hosts an interconference opponent or plays on a Thursday night, WSVN, the local Fox affiliate will have the games being televised. When playing on Sunday night, the team's matches will be broadcast on WTVJ, the NBC O&O station.

The Dolphins' radio affiliates:

English

Spanish

Season-by-season records

Roster

Current roster

Pro Football Hall of Famers and Retired Numbers

The Dolphins currently have ten players, and one coach enshrined in the Pro Football Hall of Fame, that have spent the majority (or entirety) of their careers, or made significant contributions with the Miami Dolphins. Three other players and four contributors that have spent only a "minor portion" of their careers with the Dolphins, and have been enshrined primarily with other teams, have also been enshrined in the Pro Football Hall of Fame.

{| class="wikitable" style="text-align:center"
|-
!colspan="6" style=""| Miami Dolphins Hall of Famers
|-
!colspan="6" style=""| Players
|-
!style="width:30px"| No.
!style="width:180px"| Name
!style="width:130px"| College
!style="width:130px"| Position
!style="width:100px"| Season(s)
!style="width:50px"| Inducted
|-
| 42 || Paul Warfield || Ohio State|| WR || 1970–1974 || 1983
|-
| 39 || Larry Csonka || Syracuse|| FB || 1968–1974, 1979 || 1987
|-
| 62 || Jim Langer || South Dakota State|| C || 1970–1979 || 1987
|-
| 12 || Bob Griese || Purdue|| QB || 1967–1980 || 1990
|-
| 66 || Larry Little || Bethune-Cookman || G || 1969–1980 || 1993
|-
| 57 || Dwight Stephenson || Alabama || C || 1980–1987 || 1998
|-
| 85 || Nick Buoniconti || Notre Dame|| LB || 1969–1974, 1976 || 2001
|-
| 13 || Dan Marino || Pittsburgh || QB || 1983–1999 || 2005
|-
| 99 || Jason Taylor || Akron || DE || 1997–2007, 2009, 2011 || 2017
|-
| 54|| Zach Thomas || Texas Tech  || LB || 1996–2007 || 2023
|-
!colspan="6" style=""| Coaches and Executives
|-
!style="width:130px" colspan="2"| Name
!style="width:130px"| College
!style="width:130px"| Position
!style="width:100px"| Season(s)
!style="width:50px"| Inducted
|-
|colspan="2"| Don Shula || John Carroll || Head coach || 1970–1995 || 1997
|}

Retired numbers
The Miami Dolphins currently have three retired jersey numbers:
 No. 12 for Bob Griese, which was retired on a Monday Night Football broadcast in 1985.
 No. 13 for Dan Marino, which was retired on September 17, 2000, during halftime of the "Ravens @ Dolphins" game on Sunday Night Football.
 No. 39 for Larry Csonka, which was retired on December 9, 2002 (30th anniversary of Miami's "1972 Undefeated Team"), during halftime of the "Bears @ Dolphins" game on Monday Night Football.

The Dolphins have other numbers that have currently not been issued to any player, or are currently in reduced circulation, but not yet officially retired. They include:
 No. 54 for Zach Thomas
 No. 99 for Jason Taylor

Miami Dolphins Individual Awards
Listed below are the individuals who have won the following NFL, Super Bowl, and Pro Bowl MVP awards, the Offensive and Defensive Rookie and Player of the Year awards, the winners of the prestigious Walter Payton Man of the Year Award, and the winner of the Coach of the Year Award for the Miami Dolphins.  Bold indicates those elected to the Pro Football Hall of Fame.

Miami Dolphins NFL All-Decade Team and 100 All-Time Team selections
The following are Miami Dolphins (players and/or coaches) who have been selected to an "All-Decade Team", or the NFL 100 All-Time Team by the Pro Football Hall of Fame selection committee. Bold indicates those elected to the Pro Football Hall of Fame.

Pro Bowl selections

Many former and current Miami Dolphins players have represented the franchise in the Pro Bowl. Below is a list of current or former players that play or have played for the Miami Dolphins that have been selected to at least five Pro Bowls. Bold indicates those elected to the Pro Football Hall of Fame.

The Miami Dolphins 50 Greatest Players
In 2015, to commemorate the Miami Dolphins' 50th NFL season, the Dolphins organization announced through voting from the South Florida Media and Miami Dolphin fans the results of the 50 greatest players in Miami Dolphins franchise history. The results were announced during halftime on Monday Night Football between the Dolphins and the Giants. Here are the 50 greatest Dolphins broken down by position. Bold indicates those elected to the Pro Football Hall of Fame.Offense: QB: Bob Griese, Dan Marino, Earl Morrall
 HB: Jim Kiick, Mercury Morris, Tony Nathan, Ricky Williams
 FB: Larry Csonka WR: Mark Clayton, Mark Duper, O.J. McDuffie, Nat Moore, Paul Warfield TE: Bruce Hardy, Keith Jackson, Jim Mandich
 C: Jim Langer, Mike Pouncey, Dwight Stephenson G: Bob Kuechenberg, Larry Little, Ed Newman, Keith Sims 
 T: Norm Evans, Richmond WebbDefense: DT: Bob Baumhower, Tim Bowens, Manny Fernandez
 DE: Doug Betters, Vern Den Herder, Bill Stanfill, Jason Taylor, Cameron Wake 
 LB: Kim Bokamper, Bob Brudzinski, Nick Buoniconti, Bryan Cox, A. J. Duhe, John Offerdahl, Zach Thomas CB: Brent Grimes, Sam Madison, Patrick Surtain
 S: Dick Anderson, Glenn Blackwood, Louis Oliver, Jake ScottSpecial teams: K: Garo Yepremian
 P: Reggie Roby
 ST: Jim Jensen

The Miami Dolphins Honor Roll
The Miami Dolphins Honor Roll is a ring around the second tier of Hard Rock Stadium that honors former players, coaches, owners and contributors who have made significant contributions to the franchise throughout their history. Bold indicates those elected to the Pro Football Hall of Fame.

Each of these players is honored with a placard on the facing of the upper level around Hard Rock Stadium including team founder-owner Joe Robbie. In place of a jersey number, Shula has the number 347, representing his record number of NFL coaching victories, 274 of them as Dolphins head coach.

In 1992, at the 20 year anniversary, Miami's "1972 Undefeated Team" was enshrined into the Honor Roll. At the 40 year anniversary, which enshrined former defensive coordinator Bill Arnsparger into the Honor Roll, his name went on the Honor Roll where the "1972 Undefeated Team" inductee previously and originally was enshrined, and an updated "1972 Perfect Season Team 17–0" inductee was put into one corner of Hard Rock Stadium with special placards of Super Bowl VII and Super Bowl VIII included next to it on each side.

The inductees as of 2014 include:

The Joe Robbie Alumni Plaza "Walk of Fame"

The Joe Robbie Alumni Plaza Walk of Fame was first established in 2011, designed to be all-encompassing and recognize the best of the Miami Dolphins alumni, including those in the Pro Football Hall of Fame, the Honor Roll, and as well as the many other players who were among the unsung heroes and community leaders that the organization has produced. The "Walk of Fame" is located at the north end of Hard Rock Stadium, with a life-size bronze statue of Joe Robbie, the original founder and owner of the Miami Dolphins from 1966 to 1989. Bold indicates those elected to the Pro Football Hall of Fame.

The inductees as of 2018 (by yearly class) are:
 Class of 2011: Nick Buoniconti, Larry Csonka, Bob Griese, Jim Langer, Larry Little, Joe Robbie, Dan Marino, Don Shula, Dwight Stephenson, Paul Warfield Class of 2012: Tim Bowens, A. J. Duhe, Manny Fernandez, Nat Moore, Earl Morrall, Don Strock
 Class of 2013: Kim Bokamper, Mercury Morris, O. J. McDuffie, Keith Sims
 Class of 2014: Jeff Cross, Sam Madison, Tony Nathan, Ed Newman
 No classes from 2015 to 2017, due to modernization and reconstruction at Hard Rock Stadium
 Class of 2018: Dick Anderson, Mark Clayton, Mark Duper, Jon Giesler, John Offerdahl, Jason Taylor'''

All-time first-round draft picks

Staff

Head coaches

Current staff

Notes

References

External links

 
 Miami Dolphins at the National Football League official website

 
1966 establishments in Florida
American Football League teams
American football teams in Florida
American football teams in Miami
National Football League teams
American football teams established in 1966